Tripunithura Viswanathan Gopalakrishnan (born 11 June 1932 in Tripunithura, Kerala), known as TVG, is a Carnatic and Hindustani musician from Cochin, Kerala, India. He was awarded the Madras Music Academy's Sangeetha Kalanidhi in 2014.

Early years
Gopalakrishnan was born on  June 11, 1932 into a family of musicians with a history spanning over two centuries. His father, T.G. Viswanatha Bhagavathar, was a court musician for the Cochin Royal Family and a professor of music at the S.K.V. College in Thrissur. Gopalakrishnan started playing the mridangam at the age of four and had his arangetram at the Cochin palace at the age of six. He is a disciple of Chembai Vaidyanatha Bhagavathar.

The violinist, T.V. Ramani and ghatam exponent T.V. Vasan, are his siblings. T V Gopalakrishnan, nephew of G N Balasubramaniam, who runs the popular website sangeethapriya.org, devoted to Karnatik music, is a different person.

Career
He is a musician who is equally proficient in both Carnatic and Hindustani vocals, mridangam and violin. Hailed as an innovator of Indian jazz, TVG has toured all over the world with the legends like George Harrison, Bob Dylan, John Handy, Ravi Shankar, Ustad Alla Rakha, etc. He has also collaborated with drummer/composer Franklin Kiermyer, Don Peake, Seigfried Kutterer and Carola Grey on many occasions.

Gopalakrishnan was given the Sangeet Natak Akademi Award in 1990. He has been awarded the Padma Bhushan by the Government of India in the year 2012.

In 2018, he was awarded a doctorate by Bharatidasan University for his research on the topic "Layathwam in Carnatic music". He founded a non-profit organization called the Academy of Indian Music and Arts (AIMA) with the sole vision of creating opportunities for musicians across the strata of the society in 1984. AIMA is an integrated and unique Gurukula system of specialized musical education with absolute focus on producing good professional singers and instrumentalists in various traditional disciplines, as also scholars and technicians. The art of performance and the art of teaching in music is imbibed to students of all ages and background in the unique TVG teaching method.

Discography
This is an incomplete list of releases. The release dates are also not always indicative of the original release date of the associated record.
 
 Percussion Through the Ages in South India (instructional) (1961)
 Melodious Strings of the Indian Violin (featuring T. N. Krishnan) (1991)
 Eastern Beats (solo mridangam) (1995)
 Meeting Sounds of T.V. Gopalakrishnan (featuring M. S. Gopalakrishnan) (2005)
 Maragadamani (2008)

Awards
In his career spanning over five decades, many honours and awards have been bestowed on Gopalakrishnan. These include:

 Sangeetha Kalanidhi Award from Madras Music Academy , 2014
 Padma Bhushan, 2012
 Kerala Sangeetha Nataka Akademi Fellowship, 2006
 Kerala Sangeetha Nataka Akademi Award, 1983
 Sangeet Natak Akademi Award
 Sangita Laya Samrat
 Rotary International Exemplary Citizen Award 
 Kalaimamani
 Life Time Achievement award from Bangalore Ramaseva Mandali 
 Swati Tirunall Lifetime Achievement Award 
 Sapthagiri Sangeetha Vidwan Mani Award (Tirupathi)
 Legend of India Life Achievement Award
 "Arsha Kala Bhushanam" (H.H. Dayananda Saraswathi Life Time Achievement Award) 
 Lifetime National Achievement Sankaracharya Award (Bombay), etc.
 Mudhra Award for excellence
 Lifetime achievement award from Bharath Kalachar, etc.

References

1932 births
Living people
Male Carnatic singers
Carnatic singers
Hindustani singers
Indian percussionists
Mridangam players
Recipients of the Sangeet Natak Akademi Award
Recipients of the Padma Bhushan in arts
Singers from Kochi
20th-century Indian male classical singers
20th-century drummers
21st-century Indian male classical singers
Recipients of the Sangeet Natak Akademi Fellowship
Recipients of the Kerala Sangeetha Nataka Akademi Fellowship
Recipients of the Kerala Sangeetha Nataka Akademi Award